Jetze Plat (born 10 June 1991 in Amsterdam) is a Dutch para-cyclist in the H4 class. He also competes in the paratriathlon.

Career
Plat was born with two stunted legs. In 1995, Plat started using a handcycle, to cycle to school. Later he started practising the sport para-cycling. In the beginning of his athletic career Plat was coached and trained by Kees van Breukelen. As Plat improved in the sport he was coached by Ralf Bekers. During the World Cup in Rome, Plat qualified for the 2012 Summer Paralympics in London.

In the 2016 Summer Paralympics in Rio, Plat competed in both cycling and para-triathlon. He won the paratriathlon gold medal in the PT1 class. He also won a bronze medal in the Men's Road Race in H5 class. These were his first Paralympic medals.

He was one of the flag bearers for the Netherlands during the opening ceremony of the 2020 Summer Paralympics.

In Tokyo, at the 2020 Summer Paralympics, Plat competed in both cycling and para-triathlon again. He won gold medals in the Men's H4 Road Race and Men's H4 Time Trial for cycling and a gold medal in the para-triathlon (Men's Individual PTWC).

References

External links
 Website

1991 births
Living people
Dutch male cyclists
Dutch male triathletes
Paralympic cyclists of the Netherlands
Paratriathletes of the Netherlands
Paralympic medalists in cycling
Paralympic medalists in paratriathlon
Paralympic gold medalists for the Netherlands
Paralympic bronze medalists for the Netherlands
Cyclists at the 2012 Summer Paralympics
Cyclists at the 2016 Summer Paralympics
Paratriathletes at the 2016 Summer Paralympics
Paratriathletes at the 2020 Summer Paralympics
Medalists at the 2016 Summer Paralympics
Medalists at the 2020 Summer Paralympics
Cyclists from Amsterdam
21st-century Dutch people